Igor Georgievich Suvorov (also Souvorov; in ; born February 25, 1948, in Moscow, Soviet Union) is a Russian banker, Chairman and Chief executive director of Moscow Narodny Bank (1997–2005), President of Interstate Bank (2009-2020).

Biography 
In 1972, he graduated from the International Economic Relations Faculty of the Moscow Financial Institute. From 1972 to 1980, he worked at the Monetary and Economic Directorate of the USSR State Bank, where he oversaw issues of interaction with international financial institutions and supervision of Soviet banks abroad.

From 1980 to 1986 he served as Deputy Manager of the Singapore branch of Moscow Narodny Bank (MNB). He dealt with credit policy issues of the department and with the development of its customer network.

From 1987 to 1991 he served as Deputy Head of Department, then Head of Department of Soviet banking institutions abroad of Vneshtorgbank of the USSR. Also he had been a member of the Supervisory Board of Moscow Narodny Bank. He coordinated the activities of bank’s subsidiaries in England, France, Germany, Austria, Switzerland, Luxembourg, Singapore, and Cyprus.

From 1991 to 1997 he had been Managing Director of the Singapore branch of Moscow Narodny Bank. He supervised the development of the bank’s business and its integration in servicing new trade flows between Russia and Southeast Asia. There was hardly any Russian business in Singapore when he had started his work there. The task that he successfully completed was to broaden the MNB’s operating area to look for business not only in the bank’s traditional markets, but also in new, so-called ‘emerging’ markets, whose economies were growing at a faster rate.

From 1997 to 2008 he served as Chairman of the Management Board and Chief Executive Officer of Moscow People's Bank, London, then renamed VTB Bank Europe. He led a banking group with assets of $7 billion, worked out a strategy for transforming the group into an investment bank and led its implementation. In June 2003, MNB acquired five-year $100 million loan from International Finance Corporation (IFC), the private sector financing subsidiary of the World Bank Group. In 2005, he affected the decision to acquire 10.1% of the Portuguese financial group Banco Finantia. In mid-May 2007, he initiated bank's initial public offering, which, according to analysts, helped to restore faith in the entire Russian IPO market. Both Russian and London listings attracted widespread investor support.

Since April 2009 he has been President of the Interstate Bank. While in this office, he planned to implement payments in national currencies within Eurasian Economic Union (EAEU). He is recognized by the Government of Russia as an expert on international banking issues.

On January 1, 2021, he was replaced as head of the Interstate Bank by Nikolay Gavrilov.

Personal life 
Married with two children.

References

Living people
1948 births
Financial University under the Government of the Russian Federation alumni
Russian bankers
Soviet bankers